Walter Shaw may refer to:

 Walter L. Shaw (1917–1996), American inventor
 Walter Russell Shaw (1887–1981),  Prince Edward Island politician 
 Walter Shaw (judge) (1863–1937), British colonial judge and Chairman of the Shaw Commission
 Walter W. Shaw (1880–1949), American football player and coach
 Walter Shaw (British politician) (1868–1927), British Conservative Party politician